Adam Davies is an English former professional snooker player. He is the brother of fellow snooker player Alex Davies.

Career

Davies competed as an amateur in his early teens before reaching the last 32, at three Challenge Tour events in the 2003/2004 season. These performances, coupled with a run to the last 128 at the 2004 World Championship, earned him a place on the professional tour for the following two seasons.

In his first season, as a professional, Davies won four matches, defeating Darren Morgan in the 2004 British Open, Paul Davies in the 2005 Welsh Open, Simon Bedford in the 2005 China Open and, latterly, the former world number six Mike Hallett 10–5 in the World Championship. However, he did not progress beyond the last 80 at any event, and earned no prize money.

Davies' second season on tour proved no better; entering seven tournaments, he played six matches and won only one. His 5–4 victory over Bjorn Haneveer in the 2006 China Open led to a meeting with Justin Astley in the last 80, which he did lead 3–1, but lost 3–5. At the last 96 stage of the 2006 World Championship, Davies was defeated 7–10 by Mark Allen; he was ranked 89th at the season's conclusion, and lost his professional status.

Davies entered qualifying events to regain his place on tour the following season; he reached the semi-final at one of these but, needing to win to re-qualify, remained an amateur. Further attempts in the 2007/2008 and 2009/2010 seasons were also without success.

References

English snooker players
Living people
Year of birth missing (living people)